Sphingomonas abaci  is a Gram-negative, rod-shaped and non-spore-forming bacteria from the genus of Sphingomonas which has been isolated from an examination table from the University of Veterinary Medicine Vienna in Austria.

References

Further reading

External links
Type strain of Sphingomonas abaci at BacDive -  the Bacterial Diversity Metadatabase	

abaci
Bacteria described in 2005